Crumptonia is an unincorporated community in Dallas County, Alabama.  It is named for a local plantation house of the same name, built in 1855 by Claudius M. Cochran and later owned the Crumpton family.

References

Unincorporated communities in Alabama
Unincorporated communities in Dallas County, Alabama
Populated places established in 1855
1855 establishments in Alabama